Spitfire Mk.II may refer to:

 Supermarine Spitfire Mk.II
 Spitfire Helicopters Spitfire Mk.II